Knucklebone (disambiguation) may refer to:

 The knuckles, or metacarpal bones
 Knucklebones, a game
 Knucklebone (album), a 2008 album by the musician Baracuda.